The 2011 NCAA Division II men's basketball tournament involved 64 schools playing in a single-elimination tournament to determine the national champion of men's NCAA Division II college basketball as a culmination of the 2010–11 basketball season. The winner was Bellarmine; the tournament's Most Outstanding Player was Jet Chang of runner-up BYU–Hawaii, the first player from a losing team to earn that honor in the Division II tournament since 1998.

The 2010 champion Cal Poly Pomona did not qualify for the tournament, while runner-up Indiana (PA) did. Along with Bentley, Midwestern State, and Augusta State, Indiana was one of four teams from the 2010 Elite Eight to qualify.

Qualification and tournament format
The champions of the 22 Division II basketball conferences qualified automatically. An additional 42 teams were selected as at-large participants by the tournament selection committee. The first three rounds of the tournament were organized in regions comprising eight participants in groups of two or three conferences (two in the Central and Midwest regions).  The eight regional winners then met at the Elite Eight for the final three rounds held at the MassMutual Center in Springfield, Massachusetts.

Automatic qualifiers
The following teams automatically qualified for the tournament as the winner of their conference tournament championships:

Qualified teams

Regionals

Midwest – Louisville, Kentucky
Location: Knights Hall Host: Bellarmine University

South Central – Edmond, Oklahoma
Location: Hamilton Field House Host: University of Central Oklahoma

South – Huntsville, Alabama
Location: Spragins Hall Host: University of Alabama in Huntsville

Central – Mankato, Minnesota
Location: Taylor Center Host: Minnesota State University, Mankato

Southeast – Augusta, Georgia
Location: Christenberry Fieldhouse Host: Augusta State University

Atlantic – West Liberty, West Virginia
Location: Academic, Sports, and Recreation Complex Host: West Liberty University

West – Ellensburg, Washington
Location: Nicholson Pavilion Host: Central Washington University

East – Waltham, Massachusetts
Location: Dana Center Host: Bentley College

Elite Eight – Springfield, Massachusetts 
Location: MassMutual Center Hosts: American International College and Naismith Memorial Basketball Hall of Fame

All-tournament team
 Justin Benedetti (Bellarmine)
 Jet Chang (BYU–Hawai'i)
 Jeremy Kendle (Bellarmine)
 Jefferson Mason (Minnesota State–Mankato)
 Corey Pelle (West Liberty)

References
 2011 NCAA Division II men's basketball tournament jonfmorse.com

NCAA Division II men's basketball tournament
Tournament
NCAA Division II basketball tournament
NCAA Division II basketball tournament